Scott Peak is an  glaciated mountain summit located in Denali National Park and Preserve, on the crest of the Alaska Range, in the U.S. state of Alaska. This mountain was named in 1953 by Reynold E. (Pete) Isto of the U.S. Geological Survey and Bradford Washburn to honor Lieutenant Gordon D. Scott (1925–1953), a surveyor for the U.S. Coast and Geodetic Survey who was killed in a plane crash during mapping operations of this area. Scott Peak is set ten miles south of where the crash occurred near the Stony Creek Bridge area of the park road on June 11, 1953. Established climbing routes on Scott Peak include the Northeast Face, Northwest Face, and the Sunset Glacier. The first ascent of this peak was made in 1953 by Bradford Washburn.

Climate

Based on the Köppen climate classification, Scott Peak is located in a subarctic climate zone with long, cold, snowy winters, and mild summers. Temperatures can drop below −20 °C with wind chill factors below −30 °C. This climate supports glaciers on it slopes including the Sunrise Glacier and Sunset Glacier. Precipitation runoff from the north side of the mountain drains into tributaries of the McKinley River, which in turn is part of in the Tanana River drainage basin. The Chulitna River drains the south side of the peak. The months May through June offer the most favorable weather for climbing or viewing.

See also

Mount Isto
Geology of Alaska

References

External links
 Weather forecast: Scott Peak
 Mountain Forecast 
 Aerial photo: Scott Peak upper right
Alaska Range
Mountains of Denali Borough, Alaska
Mountains of Denali National Park and Preserve
Mountains of Alaska
North American 2000 m summits